The 2017 Big Ten conference football season is the 122nd season of college football play for the Big Ten Conference and is part of the 2017 NCAA Division I FBS football season.

This was the Big Ten's fourth season with 14 teams. The defending league champion was the 2016 Penn State Nittany Lions football team. The 2017 season consisted of a nine–game conference schedule for the second year in a row.

Nebraska football coach Mike Riley was relieved from his position following the conclusion of Nebraska's 2017 season.

Ohio State defeated Wisconsin, 27–21, in the 2017 Big Ten Football Championship Game. No Big Ten teams were selected for the 2017 College Football Playoff.

Previous season
Penn State defeated Wisconsin, 38–31, for the Big Ten Football Championship Game.

Ten teams participated in bowl games. Maryland lost to Boston College, 30–36, in the Quick Lane Bowl. Minnesota won, 17–12, over Washington State in the Holiday Bowl. Northwestern won over Pittsburgh, 31–24, in the Pinstripe Bowl. Indiana lost to Utah, 24–26, at the Foster Farms Bowl. Nebraska lost to Tennessee, 24–38, in the Music City Bowl. Iowa lost to Florida, 3–30, in the Outback Bowl. Michigan lost by 1 to Florida State by a score of 32–33 in the Orange Bowl. Wisconsin won over Western Michigan, 24–16, in the Cotton Bowl. Penn State lost to USC, 49–52, in the Rose Bowl.

Ohio State was defeated by eventual national champion Clemson, 0–31, in the semifinal round of the College Football Playoffs at the Fiesta Bowl.

Rankings

Schedule

All times Eastern time.

† denotes Homecoming game

Regular season

Week 1

Week 2

Week 3

*The Florida International at Indiana game scheduled for this week was canceled due to Hurricane Irma

Week 4

Week 5

Week 6

*Indiana was originally scheduled for a bye week here, but lost a game on Sept. 16 against Florida International due to Hurricane Irma. IU picked up a game with Charleston Southern to make up for that lost game.

Week 7

Week 8

Week 9

Week 10

Week 11

Week 12

Week 13

Championship game

Week 14 (Big Ten Championship Game)

Bowl games

Rankings are from AP Poll.  All times Eastern Time Zone.

Big Ten vs Other Conferences

2017-2018 records against non-conference foes:

Regular Season

Post Season

Awards and honors

Player of the week honors

Big Ten Individual Awards
The following individuals won the conference's annual player and coach awards:

All-Conference Teams

2017 Big Ten All-Conference Teams and Awards

Coaches Honorable Mention: ILLINOIS: Nick Allegretti, James Crawford, Jaylen Dunlap, Stanley Green; INDIANA: Chris Covington, Jonathan Crawford, J'Shun Harris, Wes Martin, Luke Timian, Ian Thomas, Haydon Whitehead; IOWA: Nathan Bazata, James Daniels, Anthony Nelson, Ben Niemann; MARYLAND: Derwin Gray, J. C. Jackson, Darnell Savage; MICHIGAN: Chris Evans, Tyree Kinnel, Mike McCray, Josh Metellus, Quinn Nordin, Brad Robbins; MICHIGAN STATE: Luke Campbell, David Dowell, Kevin Jarvis, Justin Layne, Brian Lewerke, L. J. Scott, Josiah Scott, Khari Willis; MINNESOTA: Thomas Barber, Emmitt Carpenter, Carter Coughlin, Tyler Johnson, Steven Richardson, Ryan Santoso, Rodney Smith; NEBRASKA: Drew Brown, Jerald Foster, Nick Gates, JD Spielman (WR, KR); NORTHWESTERN: Garrett Dickerson, Nate Hall, Charlie Kuhbander, Tyler Lancaster, Samdup Miller; OHIO STATE: Jerome Baker, Marcus Baugh, K. J. Hill, Jalyn Holmes, Damon Webb, Mike Weber, Chris Worley; PENN STATE: Christian Campbell, Curtis Cothran, Grant Haley, Juwan Johnson, Shareef Miller; PURDUE: Ja'Whaun Bentley, Danny Ezechukwu, Lorenzo Neal, David Steinmetz, Jacob Thieneman; RUTGERS: Tariq Cole, Gus Edwards, Kiy Hester, Sebastian Joseph-Day, Dorian Miller; WISCONSIN: Quintez Cephus, Ryan Connelly, Joe Ferguson, Alex Hornibrook, Leon Jacobs, Natrell Jamerson, Olive Sagapolu.

Media Honorable Mention: ILLINOIS: Nick Allegretti, Blake Hayes, Stanley Green; INDIANA: Chris Covington, Jonathan Crawford, Chase Dutra, J'Shun Harris, Wes Martin, Robert McCray, Luke Timian, Ian Thomas, Haydon Whitehead; IOWA: Nathan Bazata, James Daniels, Ben Niemann, Nate Stanley; MARYLAND: Antoine Brooks, Jermaine Carter, Derwin Gray, J. C. Jackson, Ty Johnson, Darnell Savage; MICHIGAN: Zach Gentry, Lavert Hill, Tyree Kinnel, Patrick Kugler, David Long, Mike McCray, Sean McKeon, Josh Metellus, Quinn Nordin, Donovan Peoples-Jones; MICHIGAN STATE: Luke Campbell, Matt Coghlin, Chris Frey, Jake Hartbarger, Kevin Jarvis, Justin Layne, Brian Lewerke, Mike Panasiuk, L. J. Scott, Raequan Williams, Khari Willis; MINNESOTA: Emmitt Carpenter, Carter Coughlin, Donnell Greene, Tyler Johnson, Steven Richardson, Ryan Santoso, Rodney Smith; NEBRASKA: Drew Brown, Jerald Foster, Nick Gates, De'Mornay Pierson-El, JD Spielman; NORTHWESTERN: Garrett Dickerson, Nate Hall, Charlie Kuhbander, Tyler Lancaster, Samdup Miller; OHIO STATE: Damon Arnette, Jerome Baker, Marcus Baugh, Johnnie Dixon, Jordan Fuller, K. J. Hill, Jalyn Holmes, Dre'Mont Jones, Mike Weber, Chris Worley; PENN STATE: Troy Apke, Jason Cabinda, Christian Campbell, Parker Cothren, Grant Haley, Juwan Johnson; PURDUE: Markus Bailey, Kirk Barron, Ja'Whaun Bentley, Danny Ezechukwu, Da'Wan Hunte, Lorenzo Neal, Josh Okonye, Gelen Robinson, Joe Schopper, David Steinmetz; RUTGERS: Tariq Cole, Damon Hayes, Kiy Hester, Dorian Miller, Trevor Morris; WISCONSIN: Quintez Cephus, Ryan Connelly, Joe Ferguson, Alex Hornibrook, Leon Jacobs, Natrell Jamerson, Olive Sagapolu, Derrick Tindal.

All-Americans

The 2017 College Football All-America Team is composed of the following College Football All-American first teams chosen by the following selector organizations: Associated Press (AP), Football Writers Association of America (FWAA), American Football Coaches Association (AFCA), Walter Camp Foundation (WCFF), The Sporting News (TSN), Sports Illustrated (SI), USA Today (USAT) ESPN, CBS Sports (CBS), FOX Sports (FOX) College Football News (CFN), Bleacher Report (BR), Scout.com, Phil Steele (PS), SB Nation (SB), Athlon Sports, Pro Football Focus (PFF) and Yahoo! Sports (Yahoo!).

Currently, the NCAA compiles consensus all-America teams in the sports of Division I-FBS football and Division I men's basketball using a point system computed from All-America teams named by coaches associations or media sources.  The system consists of three points for a first-team honor, two points for second-team honor, and one point for third-team honor.  Honorable mention and fourth team or lower recognitions are not accorded any points.  Football consensus teams are compiled by position and the player accumulating the most points at each position is named first team consensus all-American.  Currently, the NCAA recognizes All-Americans selected by the AP, AFCA, FWAA, TSN, and the WCFF to determine Consensus and Unanimous All-Americans. Any player named to the First Team by all five of the NCAA-recognized selectors is deemed a Unanimous All-American.

*Sports Illustrated All-America Team (SI)
*SB Nation All-America Team (SB)
*Pro Football Focus All-America Team (PFF)
*Walter Camp Football Foundation All-America Team (WCFF)
*Bleacher Report All-America Team (BR)
*Associated Press All-America Team (AP)
*USA Today All-America Team (USAT)
*Football Writers Association of America All-America Team (FWAA)
*ESPN All-America Team (ESPN)
*CBS Sports All-America Team (CBS)
*The Sporting News All-America Team (TSN)
*AFCA All-America Team (AFCA)

Academic All-Americans

2017 CoSIDA Academic-All Americans

National award winners

Rimington Award (Best Center)
Billy Price, Ohio State

Paul Hornung Award (Most Versatile Player)
Saquon Barkley, Penn State

Lott IMPACT Trophy (Outstanding Defensive Player)
Josey Jewell, Iowa

Attendance
Through Games of November 25, 2017

Bold – Exceed capacity
†Season High

NFL Draft

Trades
In the explanations below, (PD) indicates trades completed prior to the start of the draft (i.e. Pre-Draft), while (D) denotes trades that took place during the 2018 draft.

Round one

Round two

Round three

Round four

Round five

Round six

Round seven

Sources

Head coaches
Note: All stats current through January 1, 2018

* Tom Allen was hired to replace Kevin Wilson in December 2016 at Indiana and coached the Hoosiers in their 2016 bowl game.

* Mike Riley was fired on November 25, 2017, following the conclusion of Nebraska's season.

Notes

References